Berta Gersten born Berta Gerstenman (1894 – September 10, 1972) was an American actor in Yiddish theater and later in Broadway productions. She took a major role in The Benny Goodman Story film in 1954.

Life
Gersten was born in Kraków in 1894 or maybe 1896. Her family moved to New York in 1899 where her father, Avrom Gerstenman, was a translator and her mother, Meshe (née Kopps) was a dressmaker. Her acting debut happened because her mother was working for an actor who needed a child for a production. In 1918 she was recruited by Maurice Schwartz's Yiddish Art Theatre troup performing notable Yiddish works and dramatic classics like Chekhov Ibsen and Shakespeare in Yiddish. Stayed with the theatre for 25 years frequently in leading roles with Jacob Ben-Ami.

A film adaptation of the play Mirele Efros was made in the United States in 1939. It was directed by Josef Berne with Gersten in the title role and Ruth Elbaum as Shaindl. It was made in Yiddish with English subtitles.

Gersten acted in Yiddish plays, but in 1954 she took a role in an English-speaking play "The World of Sholom Aleichem" on Broadway. She was known for acting in the theatre, but she played Benny's mother in the 1956 film The Benny Goodman Story. This was her only Hollywood film appearance. Other significant Broadway productions of The Flowering Peach (1955), A Majority of One (1959), and Sophie (1963) included Gersten in the cast. Her lasting acting role was in My Father's Court in 1971.

Death and legacy
Gersten died in hospital in The Bronx aged 78. Gersten is included in the 1971 work Notable American Women, 1607–1950; A Biographical Dictionary.

References

External links
 Mirele Efros at IMDB".

1890s births
1972 deaths
Year of birth uncertain
Yiddish theatre in the United States